Outside of Paradise is a 1938 American comedy film directed by John H. Auer and written by Harry Sauber. The film stars Phil Regan, Penny Singleton, Bert Gordon, Leonid Kinskey, Ruth Coleman and Mary Forbes. The film was released on February 7, 1938, by Republic Pictures.

Plot

Cast
Phil Regan as Daniel 'Danny' Francis O'Toole
Penny Singleton as Colleen Kerrigan
Bert Gordon as Mischa
Leonid Kinskey as Cafe Owner Ivan Petrovich
Ruth Coleman as Dorothy Stonewall
Mary Forbes as Mrs. Stonewall
Lionel Pape as Mr. Stonewall
Ralph Remley as Timothy
Renie Riano as Ellen
Peter Lind Hayes as Lind 
Joe E. Marks as Bass
David Kerman as Felix
Billy Young as Johnny
Cliff Nazarro as Cliff
Harry Allen as Old Man
Gloria Rich as Singer

References

External links
 

1938 films
1930s English-language films
American comedy films
1938 comedy films
Republic Pictures films
Films directed by John H. Auer
American black-and-white films
1930s American films